The 2022–23 Iowa State Cyclones women's basketball team represented Iowa State University during the 2022–23 NCAA Division I women's basketball season. The Cyclones are coached by Bill Fennelly, who is in his 28th season at Iowa State. They played their home games at Hilton Coliseum in Ames, Iowa as members of the Big 12 Conference.

Previous season 
The Cyclones finished the 2021–22 season 28–7, 14–4 in Big 12 play to finish in second place. The Cyclones defeated West Virginia in the quarterfinals of the Big 12 Tournament before falling to Texas in the semifinals. They received an at-large bid to the 2021 NCAA tournament as a 3rd seed in the Greensboro Region where they defeating 14 seed UT Arlington in the first round and 6th seed Georgia in the second round before getting upset by 10th seed Creighton in the sweet sixteen.

Offseason

Departures

Incoming

Recruiting
There were no incoming recruiting class for 2022.

Recruiting class of 2023

Roster

Schedule and results 
Source:

|-
!colspan=12 style=| Exhibition

|-
!colspan=12 style=| Non-conference regular season

|-
!colspan=12 style=| Big 12 regular season

|-
!colspan=12 style=| Big 12 Tournament

|-
!colspan=12 style=| NCAA Tournament

Rankings

*Coaches did not release a week 1 poll.

See also 
2022–23 Iowa State Cyclones men's basketball team

References 

Iowa State Cyclones women's basketball seasons
Iowa State
Iowa State Cyclones
Iowa State Cyclones
Iowa State